The 2011 S.League was the 16th season of the S.League, the top professional football league in Singapore. Tampines Rovers FC won their third title. As in the previous season the S.League was not allowed to send a team to the AFC Champions League because of the participation of a foreign team in the league.

Teams
Beijing Guoan Talent withdrew their participation in the league after just one season. They were replaced by Tanjong Pagar United, who returned to the highest football league of Singapore after a seven-year absence. The club will be based at Clementi Stadium.

In further changes, Sengkang Punggol were renamed to Hougang United. Moreover, Home United moved back to Bishan Stadium after splitting their previous season home matches between Clementi Stadium and Jalan Besar Stadium.

Foreign players
Each club is allowed to have up to a maximum of 4 foreign players.

 Albirex Niigata (S) and Etoile FC are not allowed to hire any foreigners.

League table

Top goalscorers

Results 
Every team will play the other teams a total of three times, either twice at home and once away or vice versa, for a total of 33 matches per team.

Regular home matches

Extra home matches

Attendance figures

S-League Awards Night Winners

See also
 2011 Singapore Cup
 2011 Singapore League Cup
 List of S.League transfers 2011

Notes and references

External links
 Official site

Singapore Premier League seasons
1
Sing
Sing